The 2015 Coupe de France Final decided the winner of the 2014–15 Coupe de France, the 98th season of France's premier football cup. It was played on 30 May at the Stade de France in Saint-Denis, Paris, between Ligue 2 club Auxerre and Paris Saint-Germain of Ligue 1. Paris Saint-Germain won the match 1–0 with a goal by Edinson Cavani, thus achieving their ninth title.

Background
It was Auxerre's sixth final, of which they had previously won four and lost one. Their last final was in 2005, a 2–1 win over Sedan, and their last defeat was their first final, losing 1–4 after extra time to Nantes in 1979. PSG played in their 13th final, having won 8 (second only to Marseille's 10). Their most recent final was in 2011, a 0–1 defeat to Lille, and their last victory was the season before that, a 1–0 win over Monaco after extra time. The two teams met in the 2003 final, which Auxerre won 2–1.

Road to the final

Auxerre
Auxerre, of Ligue 2, entered the competition in the seventh round, winning 2–0 at seventh-tier Dinsheim on 15 November. In the eighth round on 6 December, they won 3–0 away to Sarreguemines of the Championnat de France amateur 2.

In the last 64 on 4 January 2015, Auxerre won 1–0 against Championnat National club Strasbourg at the Stade de l'Abbé-Deschamps with a goal by Vincent Gragnic in the last minute of the first half. Sixteen days later in the last 32 they triumphed by the same score away to Championnat de France amateur club Jura Sud Lavans, with a first-half goal by Samed Kılıç.

Auxerre played away to third-tier Le Poiré in the last 16 on 10 February. Livio Nabab put them ahead in the second half, with Loïc Dufau equalising in added time. Auxerre won 6–5 in a penalty shootout. A shootout was also required on 5 March in the quarter-finals after a goalless draw at fellow Ligue 2 club Brest. Youssef Adnane missed their first attempt before Thomas Fontaine missed for Brest, with Frédéric Sammaritano scoring the decisive goal for Auxerre. On 7 April, Sammartino scored the only goal of a semi-final victory against Ligue 1 club and cup holders Guingamp, but Jamel Aït Ben Idir was sent off.

Paris Saint-Germain
Paris Saint-Germain, of Ligue 1, began the tournament in the last 64 with a 3–0 win away to fellow top-flight side Montpellier on 5 January 2015, with second-half goals by Clément Chantôme, Zlatan Ibrahimović and Lucas Moura. Sixteen days later in the last 32, they hosted Bordeaux and won 2–1. An Edinson Cavani header and a Javier Pastore goal gave PSG the lead at half time, although Diego Rolán scored for Bordeaux in the first minute of the second half and the hosts had Zoumana Camara sent off.

On 11 February, PSG defeated Nantes 2–0 at home in the last 16 with goals by Cavani and Yohan Cabaye while Ibrahimović was rested. In the quarter-finals on 4 March they won by the same score against Monaco, David Luiz opening the scoring after three minutes and Cavani doubling the lead later on. PSG won 4–1 in their semi-final against Saint-Étienne on 8 April, with a hat-trick by Ibrahimović which took him to 102 goals for the club, starting with a penalty for the 100th.

Match details

References

Coupe De France Final 2015
Coupe De France Final 2015
Coupe De France Final 2015
Coupe de France Finals
Coupe de France Final
Sport in Saint-Denis, Seine-Saint-Denis
Coupe de France Final